Gowdin (also Romanized as Gowdīn and Gāvdīn) is a city in Gowdin Rural District, in the Central District of Kangavar County, Kermanshah Province, Iran. At the 2006 census, its population was 3,200, in 867 families.

References 

Populated places in Kangavar County
Cities in Kermanshah Province